Anastasia Galyeta (born 10 November 1992) is a competitive ice dancer who represents Azerbaijan with Avidan Brown. Competing for Ukraine with Oleksii Shumskyi, she won four medals on the ISU Junior Grand Prix series and placed as high as 8th at the World Junior Championships.

Career 
Early in her career, Galyeta competed with Semen Kaplun for Ukraine.

Galyeta teamed up with Oleksii Shumskyi in November 2008. They placed 8th at the 2010 World Junior Championships. In February 2012, it was reported that Galyeta and Shumskyi had parted ways. 

In May 2012, the International Skating Union announced that Galyeta was ineligible to compete from 10 December 2011 to 9 June 2013 due to a doping violation at the 2011 Junior Grand Prix Final.

Galyeta began competing on the senior level with Avidan Brown in autumn 2013. They competed for Ukraine before deciding to switch to Azerbaijan in the 2016–17 season.

Programs

With Brown

With Shumskyi

Competitive highlights 
CS: Challenger Series; JGP: Junior Grand Prix

With Brown

With Shumskyi

With Kaplun

References

External links 

 
 
 

Azerbaijani female ice dancers
Ukrainian female ice dancers
1992 births
Living people
People from Novokuznetsk